Hugh Aloysius Drum (September 19, 1879 – October 3, 1951) was a career United States Army officer who served in World War I and World War II and attained the rank of lieutenant general. He was notable for his service as chief of staff of the First United States Army during World War I, and commander of First Army during the initial days of World War II.

The son of a career army officer, Drum was attending Boston College when his father was killed during the Spanish–American War. Offered a direct commission in the United States Army, Drum was appointed a second lieutenant of Infantry. He served in the Philippines during the Philippine–American War, took part in the Battle of Bayan, and received the Silver Star for heroism. He continued to advance through positions of more rank and responsibility in the early 1900s, and took part in the Veracruz and Pancho Villa Expeditions.

During World War I, Drum was chief of staff for First United States Army, and led the planning for First Army's participation in the Saint Mihiel and Meuse-Argonne offensives. He was promoted to temporary brigadier general and received the Army Distinguished Service Medal. After the war, Drum commanded 1st Infantry Brigade, 1st Infantry Division, Fifth Corps Area, and the Hawaiian Department. Having served as the Army's deputy chief of staff and inspector general, Drum was a candidate for Army Chief of Staff in 1939 but the position went to George Marshall. Drum received promotion to lieutenant general in August 1939, and commanded the Eastern Defense Command during the early years of World War II. He reached the mandatory retirement age of 64 in 1943, after which he was commander of the New York Guard (1943–1948), and president of Empire State, Inc., the company that managed the Empire State Building (1944–1951).

Drum died in New York City on October 3, 1951, and was buried at Arlington National Cemetery.

Early life
Born at Fort Brady, Chippewa County, Michigan, on September 19, 1879, Hugh A. Drum was the son of Margaret (Desmond) Drum (1846-1927) of Boston and Captain John Drum (1840–1898), a career army officer who was killed in Cuba while serving with the 10th Infantry Regiment during the Spanish–American War.

In 1894, Drum graduated from Xavier High School in New York City, which he had attended while his father was an instructor at the school.  Initially intent upon a career as a Jesuit priest, he enrolled at Boston College. Under the provisions of a recently passed law allowing recognition for sons of officers who displayed exceptional bravery during the Spanish–American War, Drum was offered a direct commission as a second lieutenant on September 9, 1898, which he accepted. (He received his Bachelor of Arts degree from Boston College in 1921.)

Start of military career

Joining the United States Army while the Spanish–American War and subsequent insurrections and conflicts were ongoing, he served with the 12th Infantry Regiment in the Philippines, and then with the 25th Infantry Regiment.  He participated in the Battle of Bayan in 1899, for which he received the Silver Citation Star, which was converted to the Silver Star when that decoration was created in 1932.

Drum later served as aide-de-camp to Frank Baldwin before returning to a series of assignments in the United States. He completed the School of the Line (precursor to the Officer Basic and Advanced Courses) in 1911 as an honor graduate.  He graduated from the United States Army Command and General Staff College in 1912, and later served there as an instructor.

In 1914 he was an assistant chief of staff for the force commanded by Frederick Funston during the Veracruz Expedition.

Drum served at Fort Bliss and Fort Sam Houston in Texas during 1915 and 1916 as part of the Pancho Villa Expedition.

World War I

Highly regarded by Major General John J. Pershing, at the start of America's involvement in World War I, Drum was named an assistant chief of staff of the First Army, commanded first by Pershing and later by Lieutenant General Hunter Liggett. In 1918, he was promoted to colonel and became First Army chief of staff. He was promoted to temporary brigadier general in the last weeks of the war. Drum was commended for his work to assemble and organize First Army's staff, and for the planning of the St. Mihiel and Meuse-Argonne offensives in September 1918, for which he received the Army Distinguished Service Medal and awards from several foreign countries. The citation for his Army DSM reads:

Between the World Wars
After the war, Drum served as the director of training and assistant commandant for the School of the Line at Fort Leavenworth, Kansas, and commandant of the Command and General Staff College, where he taught the doctrine of open warfare—stressing maneuver and marksmanship over frontal attacks and firepower, using experienced troops, and supported by large artillery barrages—that the American Expeditionary Forces had attempted to practice in France.

From there he went to the Army staff at the War Department in Washington, D.C., where he publicly clashed with General Billy Mitchell about the disposition of the U.S. Army Air Service.  During their repeated confrontations, which stretched over several years, Drum successfully lobbied Congress not to have the Air Service organized separately from the army.

From 1926 to 1927, Drum commanded 1st Infantry Brigade, 1st Infantry Division, and he was the division commander from May 1926 to May 1927.  He served again as commander of the 1st Infantry Division from September 1927 to January 1930.  From 1930 to 1931, Drum was the Inspector General of the US Army.  Drum was promoted to major general when he assumed his duties as inspector general on January 29, 1930.

In 1931 Drum was assigned as commander of the Fifth Corps Area, based at Fort Hayes, Ohio.  Drum returned to Washington in 1933 to serve as deputy to the Army's Chief of Staff, Douglas MacArthur. He headed a board of senior officers that again sought to suppress advocates of an independent air force by setting the ceiling on Air Corps requirements for numbers of aircraft and tying any funding for expansion of the Air Corps to prior funding of the other branches first. In 1934, all the members of the Drum Board also sat on the presidential-initiated Baker Board, again setting its agenda to preclude any discussion of air force independence.

In 1935, Drum was a candidate for chief of staff, but Malin Craig was selected. From 1935 to 1937, Drum commanded the Hawaiian Department. It was during Drum's posting in Hawaii that he renewed acquaintance with another ambitious officer, George S. Patton, who served as his assistant chief of staff for intelligence (G2), and with whom he had a contentious professional relationship.  At a polo match in which Patton was playing, Drum was among the spectators and rebuked Patton for his use of angry profanity during the game.  The civilian players, who were members of Hawaii's wealthy elite on friendly terms with the equally wealthy and elite Patton, humiliated Drum by standing up for Patton.

In 1938, Drum succeeded James K. Parsons as commander of First Army and assumed command of Second Corps Area headquartered at Fort Jay, Governors Island, New York.  When Craig retired in 1939, Drum was again a candidate for chief of staff.  He wanted the position badly enough to set aside his feud with Patton and ask Patton to intercede with the retired but still influential John J. Pershing, their old mentor.  Despite these efforts, Drum was passed over in favor of George Marshall. Though disappointed at not being selected, Drum was still highly enough regarded that he received promotion to lieutenant general in August 1939.

World War II
With the onset of preparations for World War II, Drum assumed command of the Eastern Defense Command, responsible for domestic defense along the Atlantic seaboard.  During the 1941 Carolina Maneuvers, Drum commanded First Army. He was embarrassed and became the subject of mockery when he was captured on the first day by troops of the 2nd Armored Division under Patton's command. After soldiers from Isaac D. White's battalion detained Drum, the exercise umpires ruled that the circumstances would not have transpired in combat, so he was allowed to return to his headquarters, enabling the exercise to continue and Drum to save face. Despite the umpires' actions, the incident indicated to senior leaders that Drum might not be prepared to command large bodies of troops under the modern battlefield conditions the Army would face in World War II, so he was not considered for field command.

Retirement
After the Carolina Maneuvers, Drum was disappointed with an offer from Secretary of War Henry L. Stimson to go on what he perceived to be a low-profile assignment as chief of staff for the Chinese army of Chiang Kai-Shek.  After declining the China mission, Drum continued as head of the Eastern Defense Command, which was expanded into the Eastern Military Area with the inclusion of U.S. bases in Bermuda and Newfoundland.  He remained in this assignment until reaching the mandatory retirement age in September 1943. At his retirement, Drum received a second award of the Army Distinguished Service medal; the award was presented by Stimson, and the citation was read by Marshall.

Post military career
Drum was the commander of the New York Guard from 1943 to 1948. During the war, the New York Guard took on many responsibilities normally performed by the National Guard, in addition to internal security measures such as protecting key facilities from saboteurs and developing plans to respond if such an event occurred. When Drum retired from command in September 1948, Governor Thomas E. Dewey promoted him to general (four stars) on the New York Guard's retired list. From 1944 until his death, he was the president of Empire State, Inc., the company that managed the Empire State Building.

Drum died in New York City on October 3, 1951. His funeral mass was celebrated at St. Patrick's Cathedral by Cardinal Francis Spellman. Drum was buried at Arlington National Cemetery, Section 3,  Site 1447-R.

Family
In 1903, Drum married Mary Reaume (1877–1960).  They were the parents of a daughter, Anna Carroll Drum (1916–1996), nicknamed "Peaches," who was the wife of Army officer Thomas H. Johnson Jr.

Legacy
The Hugh A. Drum Papers collection includes correspondence, diaries, newspaper clippings, memorandums and other official documents.  It is maintained at the U. S. Army Heritage and Education Center in Carlisle, Pennsylvania.

In 1951 Pine Camp, an Army training site near Watertown, New York, was renamed Camp Drum in General Drum's honor. The post is now known as Fort Drum, and is home to the Army's 10th Mountain Division.

Awards and honors

United States military decorations and medals
 Army Distinguished Service Medal with oak leaf cluster
 Silver Star
 Spanish War Service Medal
 Philippine Campaign Medal
 Mexican Border Service Medal
 World War I Victory Medal
 Army of Occupation of Germany Medal
 American Defense Service Medal
 American Campaign Medal
 World War II Victory Medal.
 Conspicuous Service Cross (number 7492), awarded by the State of New York in November 1948 by right of his having received the Silver Star.

Foreign orders and decorations
His foreign decorations included the French Croix de Guerre, French Legion of Honor (Commander), Belgium's Order of the Crown (Commander), and Italy's Order of the Crown.

Other honors
Drum was inducted into the Xavier High School Hall of Fame in 1931.

Drum was a member of the Scabbard and Blade Society.

In 1940, he received the Laetare Medal, awarded by the University of Notre Dame annually to recognize individuals who have contributed to the goals of the Roman Catholic church.

Drum received honorary degrees from Boston College, St. Lawrence University, Fordham University, Loyola University of New Orleans, Columbia University, Rutgers University, New York University, Manhattan College, Pennsylvania Military College, and Georgetown University.

Dates of rank
Drum's effective dates of rank were:

Notes

References

Bibliography

External links

 Hugh A. Drum at U.S. Army Pacific
Generals of World War II
United States Army Officers 1939−1945

1879 births
1951 deaths
United States Army Infantry Branch personnel
People from Chippewa County, Michigan
Military personnel from Michigan
United States Army generals of World War I
United States Army generals
United States Army generals of World War II
Boston College alumni
United States Army Command and General Staff College alumni
Burials at Arlington National Cemetery
Recipients of the Croix de Guerre (France)
Commandeurs of the Légion d'honneur
Commanders of the Order of the Crown (Belgium)
Inspectors General of the United States Army
Recipients of the Distinguished Service Medal (US Army)
Recipients of the Silver Star
Commandants of the United States Army Command and General Staff College
Xavier High School (New York City) alumni
Laetare Medal recipients